Sigma Tau Phi was a historically Jewish Fraternity founded in 1918 and which merged into Alpha Epsilon Pi in 1947.

History
Sigma Tau Phi was founded at the University of Pennsylvania in 1918. It originally only admitted men in the fields of Engineering and Architecture, which restricted its expansion, but it admitted all men after its expansion to University of Cincinnati. It became a Junior member of the National Interfraternity Conference in 1930. The membership as of 1945 was 1000. It merged with Alpha Epsilon Pi in March 1947.

Chapter List
The chapters of Sigma Tau Phi were:
Alpha - University of Pennsylvania - 1918 (Some sources say April 1917)
Beta - University of Cincinnati - 1920
Gamma - Pennsylvania State University - 1921
Delta - University of Delaware - 1925
Epsilon - Dickinson University - 1926
Zeta - Temple University - 1927
Eta - New York University - 1929

Merger with Alpha Epsilon Pi
On March 22, 1947 the Alpha chapter was merged with Gamma chapter of Alpha Epsilon Pi. The Beta chapter became Omicron Deuteron of AEPi, the Gamma colony became Pi Deuteron at chartering, the Delta chapter became Rho Deuteron. Of the remaining chapters, AEPi agreed to make efforts to reactivate the chapters at Dickinson and Temple but not the one at NYU as there was an active AEPi group there at the time.  Alpha Pi chapter of AEPi established at Temple University in 1956 is considered to be a reactivation of Zeta chapter. In addition, the Sigma Tau Phi Alumni Clubs in Wilmington, Delaware and Cincinnati Ohio were granted charters with Alpha Epsilon Pi.

Symbols
Periodical - The Record (Annual in December prior to convention)
Periodical - The News-Dispatch (Quarterly)
Periodical - Directory (Biannually)
Badge - Black Enamel with the Greek Letters    set in pearls.
Pledge button - Circular with a gold hollow triangle on a Blue Background
Colors - Blue and Gold

See also
 List of Jewish fraternities and sororities

References

Defunct former members of the North American Interfraternity Conference
Alpha Epsilon Pi
Student organizations established in 1918
1918 establishments in Pennsylvania
Historically Jewish fraternities in the United States
Jewish organizations established in 1918